DMAX may refer to:

 Dmax, Maximum point dose to an organ or tumor target in radiotherapy cancer treatment.
 In densitometry of optics and imaging "D-max" refers to maximum optical density: The greatest achievable opaqueness or optical absorbency. D-min (Minimum density) is the corresponding expression of the lowest achievable density.
 Isuzu D-Max, a pickup truck produced by Isuzu
 DMAX (engines), of Moraine, Ohio, a joint venture between General Motors and Isuzu Motors, a manufacturer of Diesel engines for trucks
 DMAX (TV channel), a German TV channel focused on men, owned by WBD
 DMAX (British TV channel), a British TV channel owned by WBD
 DMAX (Italian TV channel), an Italian TV channel owned by WBD
 DMAX (Spanish TV channel), a Spanish TV channel owned by WBD
 DMAX (Asian TV channel), an Asian TV channel owned by WBD
 DMAX (Middle East and North Africa), a pan-Arabic TV channel owned by WBD
 DMAX (Turkey), a Turkey TV channel owned by WBD
 
 China Film Giant Screen - a premium large film format company, previously known as DMAX